Janid: Atrediva is a Puerto Rican documentary series which chronicles the ups and downs of recording artist Janid's career. The eight-part, half-hour documentary reality series debuted on September 6, 2015, on the MegaTV network.  The series follows Janid and her producer and manager Kaydean after they decide to abandon their record label and pursue success in the music industry independently. It also documents the success of her hit single "Penicilina" and the process behind recording the numerous versions of the song. The show touches on Janid's struggle to stay afloat in the midst of all the challenges and obstacles she faces, her emotional issues, her love of fashion, her love life and living with endometriosis.

Episodes

Broadcast history 

The eight-part, half-hour documentary series premiered in Puerto Rico at 8:00 PM Atlantic Time Zone (AST) on September 6, 2015, on Mega TV network.

See also 
 List of Puerto Rican television series

References

External links 
 

2015 American television series debuts
2015 American television series endings
2010s Puerto Rican television series
2010s American reality television series
2010s American documentary television series